Back to The Future: The Very Best of Jodeci is a  greatest hits LP for R&B group Jodeci, released by Universal Records in 2005. The original compilation was to include the song "That Thang", which featured rap artists Trick Daddy and Trina. The song was replaced with "Good Luv", due to Atlantic Records having ownership of "That Thang".

Track listing

References

2005 greatest hits albums
Jodeci albums